Brian Knapp Gardner, also known as Brian "Big Bass" Gardner, is an American mastering engineer. He has worked on a number of recordings since the mid-1960s, including classic rock, funk, disco, alternative rock, R&B, hip hop, pop punk and dance-pop. He is known for his work on hip hop albums, including collaborations with Dr. Dre, who gave him the nickname "Big Bass".

He was last employed at Bernie Grundman Mastering, a mastering house founded and run by Bernie Grundman, and is now independent.

Gardner has been nominated eight times for the Grammy Album Of The Year Award, winning it once for the Outkast album SpeakerBoxxx/The Love Below.

References

External links
 Official website

Record producers from Idaho
Living people
Mastering engineers
Year of birth missing (living people)